Contrecœur is a city in southwestern Quebec, Canada on the south shore of the St. Lawrence River. The population as of the Canada 2021 Census was 9,480.

History

In 1672, Antoine Pécaudy de Contrecœur, a soldier of the Carignan-Salières Regiment, originally from Saint-Chef, Isère, France, was granted a seigneury by King Louis XIV. He and 68 other pioneers founded the town in 1681, and it is named in his honour. A migratory bird sanctuary is located near the town on Contrecœur Island. Contrecœur is currently twinned with Saint-Chef, in southeast France, and has been since 1993.

The steel mill in Contrecoeur-West was in 1994 privatised by the Quebec government. The initial owner of Norambar was Stelco, until Mittal purchased it in 2004. The steel mill in Contrecoeur-Est, Sidbec-Dosco, was privatised in 1994 into Ispat International. Mittal purchased that too, and merged with Arcelor to form ArcelorMittal in 2006. The Contrecoeur-West and Contrecoeur-East were administratively merged into ArcelorMittal Long Products Canada.

Gallery

Demographics 

Education
Centre de services scolaire des Patriotes operates francophone public schools, including:
 École des Coeurs-Vaillants
 École Mère-Marie-Rose

The Riverside School Board operates anglophone public schools, including:
 Harold Sheppard Elementary School in Sorel-Tracy
 Heritage Regional High School in Longueuil

See also

List of cities in Quebec

References

External links
Contrecoeur official website

Cities and towns in Quebec
Incorporated places in Marguerite-D'Youville Regional County Municipality
Quebec populated places on the Saint Lawrence River
Greater Montreal